Robert Henry Gysel (November 18, 1880 – January 5, 1938), also known as Bob Gysel, was an American escape artist, magician and skeptic.

Biography

Gysel planned to work as a pharmacist but dropped out of college. He practised as a medium under the name Joseph R. Johnson in Toledo, Ohio. He learned the tricks of the séance room and was a supplier of magic effects for fraudulent mediums. It has been suggested by magic historians that Gysel worked as an agent for Harry Houdini in the 1920s, debunking spiritualist mediums and psychics. However, John Cox has written that Gysel "provided Houdini with information on mediums and other magic-related matters, but it doesn't appear Gysel was ever employed as one of Houdini's agents."

Gysel claimed he could expose the tricks of any medium, he considered Arthur Conan Doyle to be "the nickel plated dumbell of Spiritualism." He shared with Houdini his pamphlets on psychic fakery. Gysel was known for performing the needle-through-arm trick. He contributed articles to magic magazines such as Genii and The Sphinx. His article "Spirit Tie" appeared in the Tarbell Course in Magic, Volume 6.

Houdini's death

Gysel is alleged to have predicted Houdini's death. In a letter to Fulton Oursler, he described an incident on October 24, 1926 at 10:58pm in which a framed picture of Houdini fell off his wall and smashed. He stated in the letter that he knew Houdini would die.

Publications

Psychic Fakery No. 1, 2 and 3 (1935)
Hypnotizing Wild and Domestic Animals (1936)
Picks and Padlocks (1936)

See also

Rose Mackenberg

References

External links
The Houdini Envelopes

1880 births
1938 deaths
American magicians
American skeptics
Escapologists
Harry Houdini
People from Toledo, Ohio